Charlotte Jemima Henrietta Maria Paston, Countess of Yarmouth (née FitzRoy;  – 28 July 1684) was one of the many acknowledged illegitimate children of Charles II of England.

Her mother, Elizabeth Killigrew Boyle, wife of Francis Boyle (afterwards Viscount Shannon in Ireland), had been a maid of honour to Charles II's mother, Queen Henrietta Maria.

Charlotte married firstly James Howard, with whom she had a daughter, Stuarta. In 1672 she married William Paston, later the second Earl of Yarmouth, a member of the Paston family, and had issue. Both William and his father were in high favour with the Stuarts. 

Charlotte died on 28 July 1684 in London and was buried at Westminster Abbey on 4 August 1684.

Children

With her first husband, James Howard (d. 1669), Lady Charlotte had a daughter:
 Stuarta Werburge Howard (d. 1706); died unmarried
 Stuarta was a lady-in-waiting to Queen Mary II. She was nearly married to the 1st Earl of Portland, but their engagement was abandoned. This resulted in a duel between Lord Portland and her stepfather, Yarmouth. 

Charlotte FitzRoy had at least four more children by her second husband, William Paston, 2nd Earl of Yarmouth:
 Charles Paston, Lord Paston (29 May 1673 – 15 December 1718), of Oxnead Hall, Norfolk
 Lord Paston was married to Elizabeth Pitt and had a daughter, Hon. Elizabeth Paston.
 Lady Charlotte Paston (1675–1736)
 She married Thomas Herne of Haveringland Hall, Norfolk, and had a son, Paston Herne, whose illegitimate daughter Anne Herne married Sir Everard Buckworth (later Buckworth-Herne), 5th Baronet, and was the mother of Sir Buckworth Buckworth-Herne-Soame, 6th Baronet. Lady Charlotte was also married to a Major Weldron.
 Lady Rebecca Paston (14 January 1680/1681–1726)
 She married Sir John Holland, 2nd Baronet; had issue of at least three children.
 Hon. William Paston (1682–1711), a captain in the Royal Navy; died unmarried

References

1650s births
Place of birth missing
Year of birth uncertain
1684 deaths
17th-century English people
17th-century English women
Burials at Westminster Abbey
English countesses
Charlotte
Charlotte
Illegitimate children of Charles II of England
Daughters of kings